You'll Be Safe Here is an EP by OPM rock band Rivermaya that features the eponymous song first used as the theme song of the 2004 ABS-CBN TV horror-drama series Spirits.

The CD of the EP includes two music videos for "You'll Be Safe Here", where the second video used an advanced technology that translates the song's lyrics into Filipino. The song was performed by the band at the 2006 MTV Asia Awards, where Rivermaya was the only Filipino band to perform. The song reached #1 on the Philippine music charts during its release. Two years after its release, it gained popularity in Asia and was thereafter slated for a European release.

The song "Liwanag Sa Dilim (Kaya mo 'to)" was previously released as a single on the Repackaged version of the band's album Between the Stars and Waves. It was also used as a jingle in a Pepsi advertisement and later on in an LBC Express advertisement that had the tagline "Basta Abot ng Araw, Abot ng LBC Remit Express".

The song "Imbecilesque" on the EP was previously recorded for the band's 2000 album Free.

Track listing

Personnel
Rico Blanco (lead vocals, guitar, keyboard)
Mark Escueta (drums, percussion, vocals)
Mike Elgar (guitar, vocals)
Japs Sergio (bass guitar, backing vocals on track 4)

Additional musicians:
Mel Villana - strings arrangement
Antonio Bautista, Eleazar Bautista, Proceso Yusi, Bernadette Cadorniga - violins (track 1 & 3)
Leonardo Malazo, Regina Malazo, Maritess Ibero - cellos (track 1 & 3)
Delfin Calderon - bass (track 1 & 3)

Album Credits 
Track 1 Recorded at: Tracks Studios, Mixed at Tracks Studios & HIT Productions by Angee Rozul & Rico Blanco
Track 2 Recorded at: Tracks Studios, Mixed at HIT Productions by Rico Blanco
Track 3 & 5 Recorded and Mixed at: Tracks Studios
Track 4 Recorded & Mixed at: HIT Productions. Mastered By Angee Rozul at Tracks Studios
Executive Producer: Revolver Music
Producer: Rivermaya
Design layout: Paolo Lim

"Liwanag sa Dilim" in Leni Robredo's presidential campaign 
On 8 February 2022, the remaining members of Rivermaya appeared at Leni Robredo's proclamation rally in Naga City, signaling the start of Robredo's 2022 campaign, and performed "Liwanag sa Dilim". The following day, Robredo's daughter Jillian uploaded an Instagram video post with the song on the background. Rivermaya's appearance at the rally would be the first of many appearances the band would make throughout the campaign, in which "Liwanag sa Dilim" virtually became the anthem for Robredo's supporters. On 17 April, Rivermaya created a new music video for the song, with Yeng Constantino on vocals and featuring volunteers and other celebrities involved in the Robredo campaign. On 26 April, another video with the song, featuring various celebrity musicians and singers led by singer Regine Velasquez, was released to further support the last days of the Robredo campaign.

References

2005 EPs
Rivermaya albums